Carter's Army is a 1970 American made-for-television war drama film starring a host of prominent African-American film actors, including Richard Pryor, Rosey Grier, Robert Hooks, Billy Dee Williams and Moses Gunn. The film originally aired as an ABC Movie of the Week on January 27, 1970.

The film would be released on DVD under the title Black Brigade.

Plot 
A redneck officer (Stephen Boyd) is put in charge of a squad of all black troops charged with the mission of securing an important hydro dam in Nazi Germany. Their failure would delay the Allied advance into Germany, thus prolonging the war. These African-Americans had been relegated to cleaning latrines and therefore have little real military training, but Captain Beau Carter has no choice. He leads the rag-tag unit to secure the dam and the men reveal themselves as heroic.

Cast
 Stephen Boyd as Captain Beau Carter
 Robert Hooks as Lieutenant Edward Wallace
 Susan Oliver as Anna Renvic
 Rosey Grier as Jim "Big Jim"
 Moses Gunn as Private "Doc" Hayes
 Richard Pryor as Private Jonathan Crunk
 Glynn Turman as Private George Brightman
 Billy Dee Williams as Private Lewis
 Paul Stewart as General Clark

Production
It was shot on location in Mount Pinos.

References

External links 
 

 

1970 television films
1970 films
1970s war drama films
American war drama films
American World War II films
African-American films
ABC Movie of the Week
Films directed by George McCowan
Films produced by Aaron Spelling
World War II films based on actual events
American drama television films
1970s American films
World War II television films